Kosarovo is a rural locality (a village) in Komyanskoye Rural Settlement, Gryazovetsky District, Vologda Oblast, Russia. The population was 1 as of 2002.

Geography 
Kosarovo is located 31 km northeast of Gryazovets (the district's administrative centre) by road. Yevsyukovo is the nearest rural locality.

References 

Rural localities in Gryazovetsky District